The Allied Somali Forces (ASF) was a political faction of the Somali Civil War. It was the primary opponent of the  Margans Malitia for the control of Kismayo and the Juba River valley, the area known as Jubaland.

Following the breakdown of central authority in the Somali Civil War, General Hersi "Morgan" declared Jubaland independent on September 3, 1998.

Opponents to General "Morgan" came from the Somali Marehan, Somali Clan . The Marehan Somali National Front (SNF) and other  Clan allies grouped together as the Allied Somali Forces (ASF). They ousted General "Morgan" from Kismayu in June 1999.

The ASF renamed itself the Juba Valley Alliance in June 2001, and threw its support behind the Transitional Federal Government (TFG). The leader of the JVA is Colonel Barre Adan Shire Hiiraale, who later became Defense Minister for the TFG. The militia commander of the JVA is Col. Abdulahi Sheik Ismael Fara-Tag.

References

Factions in the Somali Civil War